OGC Nice Côte d'Azur Handball is the name of a French handball club from Nice. This team currently competes in the French Women's Handball First League from 2012.

In the 2017-18 season, the club finished 2nd in the French Women's First League, after losing the two finals against Metz Handball. They defeated Brest Bretagne Handball in the semifinals. The Finalist team included several international stars such as Linnea Torstenson, Carmen Martín and Jane Schumacher.

Results
French Women's First League Championship:
Runners-up (1): 2019
French Women's League Cup Championship:
Runner-up (1): 2016

Team

Current squad
Squad for the 2022-23 season.

Goalkeepers
 16  Jovana Micevska
 99  Marija Čolić
Wingers
LW
 2  Mathilde Kérinec
 5  Dienaba Sy
 20  Mathita Diawara
RW
 17  Marie Prouvensier
 70  Margaux Le Blevec
Line players
 10  Camille Denojean 
 15  Anne-Emmanuelle Augustine  
 31  Marie Fall

Back players
LB
 11  Giulia Fabbo
 13  Djazz Chambertin
 49  Aimée von Pereira
 66  Wendy Semedo
CB
 33  Martina Školková
 86  Ehsan Abdelmalek
RB
 19  Adriana Holejova
 44  Laurène Dembele

Transfers
Transfers for the 2023-24 season 

Joining
  Nicole Wiggins (GK) (from  BM Granollers)
  Raïssa Dapina (RW) (from  Neptunes de Nantes) 
  Gordana Mitrović (LB) (from  Neptunes de Nantes) 
  Tena Petika (LB) (from  RK Lokomotiva Zagreb) 

Leaving
 Marie Prouvensier (RW) (to  Paris 92) 
 Djazz Chambertin (LB) (to  Metz Handball)

Notable former players 

 Carmen Martín
 Elisabeth Chávez
 Ana Martínez
 Beatriz Escribano
 Karen Knútsdóttir
 Arna Sif Pálsdóttir
 Linnea Torstenson
 Cecilia Grubbström
 Biljana Filipović
 Marija Čolić
 Jane Schumacher
 Samira Rocha
 Takoua Chabchoub
 Ágnes Hornyák
 Maida Arslanagić
 Aïssatou Kouyaté
 Alexandra Lacrabère
 Cléopâtre Darleux
 Nodjialem Myaro
 Béatrice Edwige
 Valérie Nicolas

References

External links
 

French handball clubs
Sport in Nice
Handball clubs established in 2011